Cressa is a genus of amphipod crustaceans in the family Creesidae, with species living in depths from 31 to 820 meters.

Species 
These species were placed by the World Register of Marine Species.

 Cressa abyssicola G. O. Sars, 1879
 Cressa bereskini Gurjanova, 1936
 Cressa carinata Stephensen, 1931
 Cressa cristata Myers, 1969
 Cressa dubia Spence Bate, 1857
 Cressa jeanjusti Krapp-Schickel, 2005
 Cressa mediterranea Ruffo, 1979
 Cressa minuta Boeck, 1871
 Cressa quinquedentata Stephensen, 1931

References 

Crustacean genera
Amphipoda